Calix, Inc. is a telecommunications company that specializes in providing software platforms, systems, and services to support the delivery of broadband services. The company was founded in 1999 and is headquartered in San Jose, California.

Calix provides cloud, software platforms, systems and services to communications service providers. 

Calix maintains facilities in Petaluma, CA, Minneapolis, MN, San Jose, CA, Richardson, TX in the USA and facilities in Nanjing, China and Bangalore, India..

Customers 
Calix customers include SCTelcom, Verizon, ALLO Communications, CityFibre, Nex-Tech, Gibson Connect, ITS Fiber, Sogetel, and over 1,600 other broadband service providers globally, majority being in North America.

Competitors 
Calix competitors include Cisco, Adtran, Nokia, Allied Telesis, Huawei, Tellabs, ZTE and DZS.

Industry News 
 With Amazon Alexa, Calix Translates Smart Home Opp Into Reality
 Amazon expands white-box Alexa device lineup with new home hub and gateway hardware
 How Verizon & Calix Unlocked NGPON2

Acquisitions history 
In 2006, Calix purchased Optical Solutions, Inc., based in Minneapolis, MN.
In 2010, Calix announced acquisition of one-time rival Occam Networks, Inc., based in Santa Barbara, California. The acquisition was completed in February, 2011.
In Nov 2012, Calix completed acquisition of Ericsson’s fiber access assets.

Other Resources

References

External links

Companies listed on the New York Stock Exchange
Companies based in Sonoma County, California
Telecommunications companies established in 1999
Telecommunications companies of the United States
Networking companies of the United States
Networking hardware companies
1999 establishments in California